Bongan (also Romanized as Bongān and Bangān; also known as Beshgān) is a village in Bezenjan Rural District, in the Central District of Baft County, Kerman Province, Iran. At the 2006 census, its population was 673, in 177 families.

References 

Populated places in Baft County